Mozgly is a rural locality (a khutor) in Grishinskoye Rural Settlement, Kikvidzensky District, Volgograd Oblast, Russia. The population was 23 as of 2010.

Geography 
Mozgly is located in steppe, on Khopyorsko-Buzulukskaya plain, 27 km southeast of Preobrazhenskaya (the district's administrative centre) by road. Chistopol is the nearest rural locality.

References 

Rural localities in Kikvidzensky District